Saint-Hilaire-de-Villefranche is a commune in the Charente-Maritime department in southwestern France. On 1 January 2019, the former commune La Frédière was merged into Saint-Hilaire-de-Villefranche.

Population

See also
Communes of the Charente-Maritime department

References

Communes of Charente-Maritime
Charente-Maritime communes articles needing translation from French Wikipedia